Yuliya Shelukhina (born 20 April 1979) is a Ukrainian volleyball player.

She competed at the 2005 FIVB Volleyball Girls' U18 World Championship, 2013 Women's European Volleyball Championship, and 2014 FIVB Volleyball Women's World Championship.

She played for Monte Schiavo Banca Marche Jesi, Grot Budowlani Łódź, and Atom Trefl Sopot.

References 

Ukrainian women's volleyball players
Living people

1979 births